William Craig Bailey (born 6 July 1944), sometimes erroneously written Baillie, is a Scottish former professional footballer who played as a forward in the English Football League for Brighton & Hove Albion, in the Scottish League for Motherwell and Brechin City, in the Irish League for Distillery and in the English Southern League for Cambridge United.

References

1944 births
Living people
Footballers from Airdrie, North Lanarkshire
Scottish footballers
Association football forwards
Kirkintilloch Rob Roy F.C. players
Brighton & Hove Albion F.C. players
Cambridge United F.C. players
Motherwell F.C. players
Lisburn Distillery F.C. players
Brechin City F.C. players
Scottish Junior Football Association players
English Football League players
Southern Football League players
Scottish Football League players
NIFL Premiership players